Mieleszyn  is a village in Gniezno County, Greater Poland Voivodeship, in west-central Poland. It is the seat of the gmina (administrative district) called Gmina Mieleszyn.

The village has a population of 921.

During the German occupation (World War II), Mieleszyn was one of the sites of executions of Poles, carried out by the Germans in 1939 as part of the Intelligenzaktion.

References

Mieleszyn